LKD may refer to:
 Société des Chemins de fer Léopoldville-Katanga-Dilolo  (LKD) in the Belgian Congo 
 Lithuanian Christian Democrats